"People Should Not Die in June in South Texas" is a short story by Chicana writer Gloria E. Anzaldúa, published in 1984.

Contents and analysis 
The story is a fictionalized account of Gloria E. Anzaldúa's father dying while she was a child, though Anzaldúa said it was "straight autobiography" and "as close to the truth as I get". The narrator is a young girl named Prieta (though her precise age is never stated), and Anzaldúa writes the story in a close, personal fashion. Though the story is bilingual—written in both English and Spanish—the narrative is increasingly written in English as the story progresses; literary critic Mary Loving Blanchard writes that Anzaldúa's choice depicts Prieta "leaving behind [...] the language of her parents and moving toward individuation via adoption of another tongue".

It is part of her collection of Prieta stories, most of which have not been published.

References

Citations

Works cited

 
 
 
 

Works by Gloria E. Anzaldúa